The Hero Group is a private, Swiss international consumer food manufacturer and marketing company, which primarily sells infant formula, baby food, jam and nutritional snack foods. In 2015, the Group generated revenues surpassing CHF 1.26 billion and had 4,300 employees around the world.

Overview
In 1995, Dr. Arend Oetker acquired a majority shareholding in Hero and re-positioned the Group to focus on branded business. Business segments that no longer fitted this brand strategy were divested. In parallel, the Group embarked on a major geographic expansion program.

Today, Hero is producing products in its core product categories. The Group's operations are based predominantly in Europe, North America, Middle East/Africa and Turkey/Central Asia.

History

1886: Foundation of Conservenfabrik Lenzburg, Henckell & Zeiler
Hero was established in 1886 when two friends, Gustav Henckell and Gustav Zeiler, set up the Henckell & Zeiler, Conservenfabrik Lenzburg to process fruit and vegetables. Henckell was an experienced conserve factory employee while Zeiler was a fruit farmer. By the end of the year, they were joined by Carl Roth as a silent partner.

1889: Carl Roth becomes a full partner
Gustav Zeiler, aged 30, died unexpectedly on February 12, 1889, and was succeeded by Carl Roth. The company was renamed Henckell & Roth.

1910: Launch of the Hero brand
The Hero brand name, derived from the first two letters of the partners’ names, Henckell and Roth, was launched in 1910. Tin cans also inspired the name with the letters H, R, and O resembling their shape. This remains true today.

1910-1939: A flourishing business and international expansion 
Between 1910 and 1939, five companies were set up or acquired in Switzerland, and the export business flourished. Subsidiaries were founded in the Netherlands (1914) and Spain (1922). By 1922, there were 31 different types of Hero conserves ranging in size from 500g jars to the 55kg oak tubs

1914: Quoted on the stock exchange
Hero was floated on the stock exchange in 1914. This year also marked the death of Carl Roth.

1940-1945: World War II and its consequences for Hero
Hero was affected by the shortages and scarcity during the war years. To ensure that supplies continued, Swiss housewives were encouraged to wash and return empty containers for reuse. Due to sugar rationing, Hero developed a conserve with less sugar and a higher fruit content, creating one of Hero's most popular brands – Hero Delicia. This premium conserve range has 60% fruit content and a lower sugar content than standard conserves.

1942: Henckell passes away
The man who contributed the first half the name Hero, Gustav Henckell, passes away early in January 1942.

1946-1994: ‘Hero Classics’ conquer the market
In the post-war period, Hero launched a range of products, including tinned ravioli (1948), fruit juices (1963) and Rösti (1968), which are still on supermarket shelves today and known as classics. In 1949, the Conservas Alimenticias Hero SA, Sao Carlos, Brazil, was formed

	Further expansion
Hero extended its activities in the baby food category with the launch of Hero Baby in Spain (1985), in the UK with Hero Foods (UK) Ltd., in Germany with the acquisition of a majority holding of Lindavia Fruchtsaft AG (1990), and in France with the takeover of Les Verges d’Alsace (1990).

1986: Hero celebrates its centenary
Hero organized a number of events to mark the 100 years since its founding. On the business side, the company purchased the conserve factory De Betuwe in Tiel, the Netherlands, among others.

1995: Hero under the ownership of the Oetker Family
In 1995, the German company Schwartau International GmbH, founded in 1899 and owned by Dr Arend Oetker, acquired a majority stake in Hero.  A year later, Hero entered the North American market through a joint venture with McCormick to form Signature Brands LLC with the aim to manufacture food decoration products. Hero sold off its British Rayner subsidiary and non-Hero branded fruit juices companies, including Klindworth and Lindavia.

2000-2014: Becoming an International House of Brands
In 2002, Hero acquired a majority stake in Schwartau.  In 2003, it delisted from the Swiss Stock Exchange. Hero expanded into Turkey and the Middle East through the acquisition of the Egyptian jam company Vitrac and the setup of a joint venture with Ülker Group to produce baby food in Turkey. 
Hero also entered the Swiss baby food market by acquiring Wander's Adapta and Galactina brands and expanded into Eastern Europe through the purchase of the Sunar trademark in the Czech Republic and Slovakia.

In 2005, Hero purchased the Beech-Nut baby food business in the United States and set up a large R&D centre for infant nutrition in Spain. 

In 2006, the company acquired Semper, the leading baby food manufacturer in Scandinavia, and a year later it added the Friso brand (today Hero Baby) from Friesland Foods to its infant nutrition portfolio. 
Hero also acquired the Juvela gluten-free business in the UK strengthening its position in nutritional products. Hero expanded into the Russian market, entered the organic baby food sector in the UK through the acquisition of Organix, and the Belgian market through a licensing agreement with Blédina. 

In 2009, a new baby food plant was opened in Ankara, Turkey, as part of the joint venture between Hero and Ülker, and a marketing partnership with Abbott Nutrition in the USA was established. 

In June 2010, Hero started production in the newly built Beech-Nut baby food plant in the US. 

In 2014, Hero acquired full ownership of the business in Turkey, where all products are now sold under the Hero Baby brand.

2011: New premises
The building of the Hero Group's new headquarters and factory in Lenzburg was completed, a project which was to be completed a year later, right on time for the company's 125th anniversary. Previously, the company had its production facilities and offices right next to the Lenzburg train station.

2012: New CEO
In 2012, Dutch national Rob Versloot was appointed as CEO of the Hero Group.

2015: Expansion into South America
In December 2015, the Hero Group entered into a joint venture with Kiviks Marquand, the makers of the Queensberry jams, the market leader in Brazil.

References

External links
Official Site
Hero Switzerland
Hero Benelux
Hero Spain

Food and drink companies of Switzerland
Lenzburg
Swiss companies established in 1886
Food and drink companies established in 1886
Swiss brands